The 2016–17 Northern Iowa Panthers women's basketball team will represent the University of Northern Iowa in the 2016–17 NCAA Division I women's basketball season. The Panthers, led by tenth year head coach Tanya Warren, played their home games at McLeod Center and were members of the Missouri Valley Conference. They advanced to the championship game of the Missouri Valley Tournament where they lost to Drake. They received an at-large to the NCAA women's tournament for the first time since 2011 where they lost to DePaul in the first round.

Roster

Schedule

|-
!colspan=9 style="background:#660099; color:#FFD700;"| Exhibition

|-
!colspan=9 style="background:#660099; color:#FFD700;"| Non-conference regular season

|-
!colspan=9 style="background:#660099; color:#FFD700;"| Missouri Valley Conference Regular season

|-
!colspan=9 style="background:#660099; color:#FFD700;"| Missouri Valley Tournament

|-
!colspan=9 style="background:#660099; color:#FFD700;"| NCAA Women's Tournament

See also
2016–17 Northern Iowa Panthers men's basketball team

References

Northern Iowa Panthers women's basketball seasons
Northern Iowa
Northern Iowa
Panth
Panth